Karposh Point (‘Nos Karposh’ \'nos 'kar-posh\) is the ice-free point on the north coast of Snow Island in the South Shetland Islands, Antarctica. It is projecting 500 m into Morton Strait, and is situated 2.3 km west of the extreme northeast point of President Head, 2.5 km east-southeast of Gostun Point, and 4.8 km east-southeast of Cape Timblón. Calliope Beach extends for 2.9 km eastwards from the point.

The point is "named after Karposh, leader of a Bulgarian uprising in 1689 AD."

Location
British mapping in 1968, Bulgarian  in 2009.

Map
 L.L. Ivanov. Antarctica: Livingston Island and Greenwich, Robert, Snow and Smith Islands. Scale 1:120000 topographic map.  Troyan: Manfred Wörner Foundation, 2009.

Notes

References
 Bulgarian Antarctic Gazetteer. Antarctic Place-names Commission. (details in Bulgarian, basic data in English)

External links
 Karposh Point. Adjusted Copernix satellite image

Headlands of the South Shetland Islands
Bulgaria and the Antarctic